Associação Desportiva Guarulhos, or simply Guarulhos, is a Brazilian football team based in Guarulhos, São Paulo. Founded in 1964, it plays in Campeonato Paulista Segunda Divisão.

The club was formerly known as Associação Desportiva Vila das Palmeiras.

History
The club was founded on January 1, 1964, as Associação Desportiva Vila das Palmeiras. It professionalized their football department in 1981, and adopted the name Associação Desportiva Guarulhos in 1994.

Stadium
Associação Desportiva Guarulhos plays its home games at Estádio Municipal Antônio Soares de Oliveira. The stadium has a maximum capacity of 15,000 people.

References

Association football clubs established in 1964
Football clubs in São Paulo (state)
1964 establishments in Brazil